Thomas Eblen (born 23 May 1997), better known as Blondey McCoy, is an English artist, skateboarder and model.

Early life 
McCoy was born to a British mother and Lebanese father, although was raised by his grandmother. He was educated at Rokeby Preparatory School in Kingston Upon Thames, and later Westminster School in central London. He was asked to leave Westminster school following continued absences.

Art 

McCoy works in several genres and mediums, including collage, installation art and murals. After moving away from skateboarding, Blondey began to focus more of his energy on creating art and fashion.

Skateboarding 
McCoy became sponsored by Palace Skateboards in 2012, when he was just 14 years old. He featured in multiple Palace video parts, including Palasonic, one of Palace's seminal skateboard videos, released on 8 November 2017, as well as producing his own videos. In 2019 he announced his departure from the brand via an Instagram post.

Clothing Line 
Blondey conceived the idea for his brand Thames as part of his GCSE Art project, and in 2014 it began working alongside Palace Skateboards. In 2019, he parted ways with the brand and decided that he wished to regain creative control of Thames, and thus rebranded it as Thames MMXX. Since 2019, McCoy has been the creative director of this brand, which draws from both British and skateboarding culture.

Modelling 
McCoy has modelled for Supreme, Burberry, Valentino, Palace and Adidas. McCoy has a long relationship with photographer Alasdair McLellan that has culminated in a book of their model/photographer relationship titled 'Blondey 15-21' published June 2019.

He is represented by the Kate Moss agency.

References

External links 
 

British male artists
English skateboarders
English male models
Living people
1997 births
British people of Lebanese descent
People educated at Westminster School, London